Paul Bryers (born 1 August 1955 in Liverpool) is a British film director, screenwriter and fiction author.

Biography
Paul Bryers studied Modern history, politics and economy at the University of Southampton. Later he joined the Daily Mirror’s training scheme for journalists. He worked there for two years, and then became a reporter and presenter for the British commercial television station Southern ITV. Later he became producer and director, covering conflicts in Africa, the Middle East and South America.

Film, television and radio
After his career as a reporter, Paul Bryers became especially known for his documentaries and docudramas for the television channels BBC Two, Channel 4, Channel 5 and PBS.

He wrote the radio play, The Floating Republic, about the Nore Mutiny for BBC Radio 4 which was broadcast on Saturday 4th December 1982 and starred Brian Cox as the mutineer Richard Parker.

Bryers got quickly noticed by docudramas as A Vote For Hitler (1988) about the Munich Agreement in 1938 and the subsequent 1938 Oxford by-election, and A Strike Out of Time (1990), a docudrama about the miners’ strike in 1985.

In 2001 he made the four-part TV series Queen Victoria's Empire with Donald Sutherland, which won the Outstanding achievement award at the New York Film Festival in 2002.

Besides documentaries and docudramas Bryer adapted some classics of the world literature for television.  In 1992 he made the TV film Incident in Judea, an adaptation of the biblical chapters from the novel The Master and Margarita by Mikhail Bulgakov with Mark Rylance in the role of Yeshua (Jesus) and John Woodvine in the role of Pontius Pilate, and in 1992 he made a screen version of the theater play The Golden Years by Arthur Miller about the conquest of Mexico by Hernán Cortés, with Robert Powell as the conquistador Cortés and Ronald Pickup as Montezuma.

The author Paul Bryers
Paul Bryers is also the author of several novels, published between 1976 and 2003. He got the British Arts Council Award for Best First Novel.
 
In 2008 he started writing The Mysteries of the Septagram, a series of novels for children and teenagers. The first in the series, Kobal, was published in 2008 and was nominated for the Waterstone's Book of the Year Award. Thereafter followed Avatar (2009) and Abyss (2010). His next novel for children and young adults is to be published by Hachette Children's Books in August 2013.  Called 'Spooked:The Haunting of Kit Connelly' it tells the story of a girl whose meeting with her own ghost changes her life.

The author Seth Hunter
In 2008 Paul Bryers started another series of books under the pseudonym Seth Hunter. The stories play in the time of the War of the First Coalition, an armed conflict between the revolutionary France and an alliance of European powers, later known as the First Coalition. The hero of these novels is called Nathan Peake.

Filmography
1988 – A Vote for Hitler (TV film, Channel 4)
1989 – The Survivor's Guide (Documentary TV series, Channel 4)
1990 – A Strike Out of Time (TV film, Channel 4)
1991 – Incident in Judaea (TV film, Channel 4)
1992 – The Golden Years (TV film, Channel 4)
1993 - The Essential History of Germany (Documentary, BBC Two)
2001 – Tales from the Tower (Docudrama, The Learning Channel)
2001 – Queen Victoria's Empire (Documentary TV series, PBS)
2002 – Harem (Docudrama series, Channel 4)
2003 – Seven Wonders of the Industrial World – The Line (TV series, BBC Two)
2004 – The Great Nazi Cash Swindle (Documentary, Channel 4)
2005 – Murder at Canterbury (Docudrama, BBC Two)
2005 – Flood at Winchester (Docudrama, BBC Two)
2005 – Nelson’s Trafalgar (Docudrama, Channel 4)

Bibliography

Novels
1978 – Hollow Target
1978 – Cat Trapper
1982 – Hire Me a Base Fellow
1987 – Coming First
1991 – The Adultery Department
1995 – In a Pig’s Ear
1998 – The Prayer of the Bone
2003 – The Used Women’s Book Club

The Mysteries of the Septagram
2008 – Kobal
2009 – Avatar
2010 – Abyss

Seth Hunter
2008 – The Time of Terror
2009 – The Tide of War
2010 – The Price of Glory
2011 – The Winds of Folly
2012 - The Flag of Freedom
2013 - The Spoils of Conquest

References

External links
  Official website
  Paul Bryers in the Internet Movie Data Base

British cinematographers
English cinematographers
English children's writers
1954 births
Living people
English male writers